The Zorge is a tributary of the Helme in central Germany. In many sources the name Zorge is translated as "wild river".

Course 
It then flows in a southerly direction through Zorge and Ellrich to Nordhausen. The Zorge discharges into the Helme northeast of Heringen.

The headstreams of the Zorge, like other streams such as the Wieda, drain one of the rainiest regions of the Harz. The quantities of water it carries to the Helme are one of the reasons for the construction of the Kelbra Reservoir on the Helme.

Tributaries 
 Wolfsbach (left headstream)
 Sparakelbach (right headstream)
 Steigerwasser (right)
 Elsbach (left)
 Dörenbach (right)
 Illigesbach (right)
 Rosenbach (left)
 Sülze (left)
 Wieda (right)
 Bere (left)
 Kappelbach (left)
 Orbach (left)
 Gumpebach (left)
 Roßmannsbach (left)
 Leimbach (left)
 Krummbach (left)

See also
List of rivers of Lower Saxony
List of rivers of Thuringia

References 

Rivers of Lower Saxony
Rivers of Thuringia
Rivers of the Harz
Osterode (district)
Nordhausen, Thuringia
Rivers of Germany